Charles Frederick may refer to:
Sir Charles Frederick (MP) (1709–1785), British Member of Parliament
Charles Frederick, Grand Duke of Baden (1728–1811)
Charles Frederick (Royal Navy officer) (1797–1875), British admiral
Charles Frederick, Grand Duke of Saxe-Weimar-Eisenach (1783–1853)
Charles Frederick, Prince of Hohenzollern-Sigmaringen (1724–1785)
Charles Frederick (American football) (born 1982), American football player
Charles Arthur Frederick (1861–1913), British courtier
Charles Osmond Frederick, British engineer
Charles Frederick, Duke of Holstein-Gottorp (1700–1739)
Charles William Frederick, Margrave of Brandenburg-Ansbach (1712–1757)
Sir Charles Edward Frederick, 7th Baronet (1843–1913), of the Frederick baronets
Sir Charles Edward St John Frederick, 8th Baronet (1876–1938), of the Frederick baronets
Sir Charles Boscawen Frederick, 10th Baronet (1919–2001), of the Frederick baronets

See also
Charles D. Fredricks (1823–1894), American photographer
Charles Fredericks (1918–1970), American actor
Frederick Charles (disambiguation)